The Neta S is a battery-powered mid-size sedan produced by the Chinese electric car company Hozon Auto under the Neta (Nezha) brand, a Chinese all-electric car marque, manufactured by the Zhejiang Hezhong New Energy Automobile Company.

History

Hozon Auto launched the Neta S during the 2021 Shanghai Auto Show in April 2021. Originally previewed by the Neta Eureka 03 Concept, the Neta S received a restyled front end compared to the concept car. According to the company, the Eureka 03 also has a Level 4 autonomous driving system.

Electronics for the Neta S are co-developed with Huawei.

Foreign markets
In December 2022 during the 39th Thailand International Motor Expo, Neta launched the Neta S for the Thailand market.

References

Sports sedans
Production electric cars
Cars introduced in 2021
Vehicles codeveloped with Huawei
Hybrid electric cars